Anatoly Georgievich Ufimtsev (1880-1936) was a Russian engineer and aviation pioneer.  He was born in Kursk.  He invented a radial engine for which he received a Russian patent and designed his own vehicles "Spheroplane 1" and "Spheroplane 2". He later designed and built agricultural equipment and wind turbines.

Ufimtsev's inventions

References

1880 births
1936 deaths
20th-century Russian inventors
Russian aerospace engineers
People from Kursk
Aviation inventors